Mikko Komulainen (born March 4, 1994) is a Finnish ice hockey player. He is currently playing with D-Kiekko in the Suomi-sarja, the third tier league in Finland.

Komulainen made his Liiga debut playing with KalPa during the 2013–14 Liiga season.

References

External links

1994 births
Living people
Finnish ice hockey forwards
KalPa players
Iisalmen Peli-Karhut players
People from Iisalmi
Sportspeople from North Savo